The 2002–03 Segunda Liga season was the 13th season of the competition and the 69th season of recognised second-tier football in Portugal.

Overview
The league was contested by 18 teams with Rio Ave FC winning the championship and gaining promotion to the Primeira Liga along with FC Alverca and Estrela Amadora. At the other end of the table Leça FC and União Lamas were relegated to the Segunda Divisão along with SC Farense who were relegated for financial reasons.

League standings

Footnotes

External links
 Portugal 2002/03 - RSSSF (Jorge Santos, Jan Schoenmakers and Daniel Dalence)
 Portuguese II Liga 2002/2003 - footballzz.co.uk

Liga Portugal 2 seasons
Port
2002–03 in Portuguese football leagues